Geydar Dzhahidovich Dzhemal (sometimes transliterated as Heydar Jamal; 6 November 1947 – 5 December 2016) was a Russian Islamic public figure, activist, philosopher, poet, political and social activist. He was the founder and chairman of the Islamic Committee of Russia
 

He was also the Co-chairman and member of the Presidium of the Russian Social Movement "Russian Islamic Heritage", permanent member of the Popular Arab and Islamic Congress, one of the founders and a member of the Coordinating Council of the Left Front, member of The Other Russia. He took part in the Dissenters' March.

Early life and education
Dzhemal was born on 6 November 1947 in Moscow. His father was the Azerbaijani artist Dzakhid Dzemal, who is believed to be a descendant of Hulagu Khan. His mother was Irina Shapovalova, a well-known equestrian and horse trainer descended from the noble Shepelev family. His parents divorced when he was very young and he was raised by his maternal grandparents. Dzhemal's maternal grandfather, Igor Shapovalov, was a professor of German philosophy, as well as the director of the Maly Theatre and First Deputy Minister of Culture of the Soviet Union. 

In 1965, after graduation from school, Dzhemal entered the Institute of Oriental Languages at Moscow State University, but a year later was expelled for "bourgeois nationalism". He later took a job as an editor at the "Medicine" Publishing House, where he met a Moscow State University graduate, Ilya Moskvin. He worked at the "Medicine" as an editor and edited many books on psychiatry.

Activist history
In the 1960s and 1970s, Dzhemal joined a number of loosely-affiliated bohemian underground organisations (tusovka) associated with Yuri Mamleev. Some members of these groups had access to secret collections of the All-Russia State Library for Foreign Literature and brought works by a number of mystics and philosophers (including well-known esoterists Julius Evola and Alain de Benoist) to these discussions. Through Mameleev, these works became popular among an intellectual strain of Russian neo-Nazism.

Under KGB pressure, the organisation disbanded; to escape compulsory military service, Dzhemal claimed to be schizophrenic and was sent to a psychiatric institution. In 1974, after Mameleev emigrated to the United States, Dzhemal and political analyst Aleksandr Dugin (who Dzhemal later called "a brilliant thinker" and his "former disciple") met with philosopher Evgeniy V. Golovin, who established the "Black Order of the SS". In the late 1980s, both were members of the nationalist Pamyat society, but were excluded for alleged occultism.

Foray into Islam
From 1980, he was a member of the Islamic movement of Tajikistan, and in 1990, joined members of the underground organizations of the Caucasus and Volga regions of Russia in the formation of an umbrella Islamic Revival Party that was active throughout the Soviet Union and whose leadership came from various Islamic traditions. The party alleged that only Soviet Muslims (Turks, Caucasians and Islamised Slavs) would allow the Soviet Union to meaningfully oppose the West. During the Civil War in Tajikistan, Dzhemal worked as an advisor to Davlat Usmon, one of the founders of the Islamic Revival Party of Tajikistan.

In the Islamic Renaissance Party in Astrakhan, he became a deputy chairman of the party. In the same year, he established an information center Tawḥīd and launched the Islamic Russian-language newspaper Al-Waḥdat (Unity). During the disintegration of the USSR, the Tajik branch of the IRP would be his next step where he assumed the position of Russian delegate at the Russian Center, a representative body within the party's central committee.

During the Tajik Civil War of 1992, he was appointed as a political advisor to Vice Premier of the Islamic Democratic Coalition Government led by Davlat Usmon. He was a participant in the Popular Arab and Islamic Conference in Khartoum and consecutively became a member of its permanent council. During his time in Khartoum, he became acquainted with Dr. Hassan Al-Turabi, who requested he run the Islamic Committee of Russia. Around this time he also began to produce TV series and films about Islam and philosophy, such as Now, All Koran Suras, and One Thousand and One Days. 

Since 1995, the Islamic Council became affiliated with the Union of Muslims of Russia led by Nadirshakh Khachilaev. From 1996 he became advisor to Alexander Lebed and cooperated with him and the Union of Patriotic and National Organisations of Russia to support a block on General Lebedev's presidential campaign.

While being a member of the Central Council СПНОР Djemal was an intermediary between Lebedev and Maskhadov during the First Chechen War. He established connections with Muslim organizations in Europe with  headquarters located in Florence, Italy. The first meeting was held in December 1993. He maintained contact with the British Muslim Council, the Islamic Parliament of the United Kingdom, and the Sorbonne Friends of Islam Club, created by Roger Garaudy and Rashid Benissa, the UNESCO Senior Inspector for Refugees.

In 1993, Djemal got acquainted with the son of the deceased Ayatollah Khomeini, Ahmad. In the early 1990s, Dzhemal put on a few TV shows on Islamic issues (Nyne (Today), Minaret, etc.). In May 1994, Djemal's documentary, Islamic Republic of Iran, was broadcast by the Russian channels Pervij and The First creating a political scandal which resonated with anti-Iran sentiments in Russia.

In 1998, he toured South Africa, giving lectures. At the invitation of Nelson Mandela's associate Sheikh Ahmad Yassin, Djemal went to South Africa to deliver a course of lectures on social anthropology and political philosophy at the University of Cape Town. For this course, he received an honorary doctorate at the University of Cape Town.

In 1999, at the Eastern Orthodox-Islamic conference in St. Petersburg he put forward the thesis of the possibility of an anti-imperialist strategic alliance between Muslims and Orthodox Christianity's spirituality.

For 25 years, Djemal gave lectures, wrote and published articles on a wide range of topics and public commentaries on political and social events, and cooperated in various intellectual gatherings in Russia and abroad.

In 2010 Dzhemal commented on the Armenian-Azerbaijani Nagorno-Karabakh conflict. He was also among the 34 first signatories of an online anti-Vladimir Putin manifesto, "Putin Must Go", published on 10 March 2010.

In 2011, Dzhemal founded the intellectual club Florian Geyer. 

Geydar Djemal died on 5 December 2016 in Almaty.

In accordance with his will, he was buried in Baganashyl cemetery in the foothills of the Tien Shan.

On 30 July 2018, his son, journalist , was killed along with film director and cameraman while filming a documentary about the activities of a Russian paramilitary organization Wagner Group in the Central African Republic.

Religious views 

There is a debate about Jamal's religion. Thus, the religious scholar and Islamic scholar Roman Silantyev and the journalist Yulia Latynina pointed out that Jamal professed Shia Islam and was a Jafarite. At the same time, the head of the World Congress of Tatar Youth Ruslan Aysin on 6 December 2016 in connection with the funeral of Jamal stated the following: "He was buried following Sunni Tradition - he was a Sunni, and in general was an opponent of division. He believed that the platform of Muslims is a platform of unification, and he strongly insisted on it. His philosophy and methodology were based on the idea that Muslims should unite.

The Internet portal "Voice of Islam" reports that Geydar Jamal has long professed a Shiite current, but in recent years has changed his mind about him.

It must be said that in the last years of his life Heydar, by the grace of Allah, made a sharp and difficult turn for him in moral and intellectual respect - to his umma, what it is and what it was throughout its history. Being for many years not just a Shia, but the most striking and convincing Russian-speaking Shia, he realized in the midst of Jihad in Shamthat Shia and Shi'ism had become a force against Islam and umma, made a decisive choice in favor of the latter. This choice was especially valuable, given what was being done at a time when Heydar already knew that he was seriously ill and perhaps realized that his earthly path was running out.

At the same time, Jamal himself announced the following on his official website in 2008. 

Recently, many people have asked me about my belonging to one direction or another within Islam. Some people say, "We agree with you in many ways, but here you are Shia. Oh, if you weren't Shia!.."
To once and for all remove any questions that arise in the brothers, I officially declare the following:

 1. I follow myself and support all who follow, the Quran and the authentic Sunnah of the Prophet  ﷺ.

 2. I stand for the complete and inseparable theological and political unity of all Muslims on the platform of jihad in the path of Allah until all religion on earth belongs to Him Alone.

 3. I do not follow any of the living Shiite Mujtahids.

 4. I categorically reject pantheism and the Sufi Aqeedah based on it and the teachings of Muhammad ibn al-Arabi, which is the basis of the Irfan of the Kum theological school.

 5. I do NOT curse any of the Rashidun (May Allah be pleased with them!).

 6. I believe that in all directions of Islam, created by sincere Muslims making efforts in the way of Allah, except for misconceptions, there is also a grain of truth, which will be demanded in the 73rd direction/sect, designed to carry out the complete victory of Muslims over Dajjal under the leadership of the expected Mahdi (and on the arrival of Mahdi is agreed upon by all sects of the Muslims!)

Political analysis and philosophy 
Dzhemal's political analyses have been characterized in various ways. Some have seen it as an Islamic style of Marxism, whereas others have linked his views to fundamentalist Islam. The names of his informational outlets (Tawḥīd and Al-Waḥdat, meaning "monotheism" and "unity") are key aspects of Salafism. He has attempted to bridge differences between Shiism and Sunnism; in 1999, Dzhemal emphasized the "inner spirit" of Shia Islam and the "outer" geopolitical dimension preserved in Sunnism, and claimed these differences were "already being washed away".

List of works

References

External links

 Personal website for Geydar Dzhemal 
 Geydar Dzhemal on YouTube
 Conceptual Club "Floryan Gayer" Geydar Dzhemal's think tank 
 Archive of Dzhemal's blog at LiveJournal 
 

1947 births
2016 deaths
Russian politicians
Russian people of Azerbaijani descent
Islam in Russia
Writers from Moscow
Russian Islamists
Russian Shia Muslims
Russian philosophers
Islamic philosophers
Esotericists
Liberation theologians
Russian male novelists
Russian male poets
20th-century Russian male writers